Connolly is a northern suburb of Perth, Western Australia, located within the City of Joondalup adjacent to Joondalup's central business district. It was built in the late 1980s as a golf course estate. Its eastern border backs onto the Mitchell Freeway. Many homes feature on the edges of Connolly but the homes bordering the golf course are generally larger and more affluent.

The suburb was named in honour of John Connolly who held land in the area in 1838. Connolly was a private in the 63rd Regiment who arrived in the colony in 1829 and who farmed at Upper Swan and Bindoon after being discharged in 1834.

Geography
Connolly is bounded by Shenton Avenue to the north, the Mitchell Freeway to the east, Hodges Drive to the south, and Marmion Avenue to the west.

Education
The suburb is served by a single primary school, Connolly Primary School, located on the eastern side of the suburb. Government school students attend different high schools based upon which side of the golf course they reside. Those on the western side attend Ocean Reef Senior High School, while those in the east attend Belridge Senior High School. Some students opt to attend Lake Joondalup Baptist College or Prendiville Catholic College, both independent schools.

Significant events

An entire local street, namely Prairie Dunes Place has gained notability for its annual Christmas lights display. Since 1999, the street has been raising funds for the Association for the Blind WA and in this time has raised in excess of $80,000 [AUD] (2007) towards the training of guide dogs.

Transport 
The suburb is served by bus links which provide connections back to the Joondalup Line via either the Whitfords or Joondalup railway stations.

Bus routes
 460 Whitfords - Joondalup
 461 Whitfords - Joondalup
 462 Whitfords - Joondalup
 470 Whitfords - Joondalup

References

Suburbs of Perth, Western Australia
Suburbs in the City of Joondalup